Anisolabis breviforceps is a species of earwig in the genus Anisolabis, the family Anisolabididae, the suborder Forficulina, and the order Dermaptera. It was first classified in 1979 by Brindle.

References

External links 
 The Natural History Museum's card on Anisolabis breviforceps, showing the original citation information.

Anisolabididae
Insects described in 1979